Norjmoogiin Tsedenbal (born 12 September 1988) is a Mongolian footballer who plays as a defender for Mongolian Premier League club Ulaanbaatar City and the Mongolian national team.

Career
In March 2017 he joined Mongolia Premier League club Ulaanbaatar City FC on a 2-year contract.

Tsedenbal scored the first goal worldwide in 2022 FIFA World Cup qualification, opening the scoring against Brunei with a ninth minute free kick in the first leg of the First Round of AFC Qualifiers on 6 June 2019.

International goals
Scores and results list Mongolia's goal tally first.

References

1988 births
Living people
Mongolian footballers
Ulaanbaataryn Unaganuud FC players
SP Falcons players
Ulaanbaatar City FC players
Association football midfielders
Mongolia international footballers
Mongolian National Premier League players
Tuv Buganuud FC players